Hill House in Helensburgh, Scotland is a building by architects and designers Charles and Margaret Macdonald Mackintosh. The house is a prominent example of the Modern Style (British Art Nouveau style). It was designed and built for the publisher Walter Blackie in 1902–1904.

Mackintosh also designed the house interior, including furniture and fittings. In 1982, the house was donated to the National Trust for Scotland (NTS) which maintains and opens the house to visitors.

The client 

Helensburgh, to the west of Glasgow was settled by businessmen whose wealth came from the industrialised city. In 1902, Walter Blackie, of the publishers Blackie and Son, purchased a plot on which to build a new home. At the suggestion of Talwin Morris, Charles Rennie Mackintosh was appointed to design and build Hill House.

Blackie was surprised at the youthfulness of the architect but, after visiting other houses Mackintosh had designed, was convinced he was the right person. Blackie stipulated that the construction could not be bricks and plaster or wood beam, or that the house have a red-tiled roof, as was traditional in the west of Scotland. Instead, Blackie asked for grey rough-cast walls and a slate roof; and that architectural effects ought to be secured by the massing of the parts rather than ornamentation. The requirements and non-traditional taste of the client allowed Mackintosh full rein for his design ideas.

Before creating an elevation drawing or floor plan, Mackintosh spent some time in Blackie’s home to observe their everyday life. By analysing the family's habits, Mackintosh could design every aspect of the house according to the needs of each user. He believed functional issues should be solved before allowing the design to evolve.

The house is reportedly haunted and a staff member described a tall slender figure dressed in black with a long black cape that appeared from Mr Blackie's Dressing Room. Upon entering the White Bedroom the figure vanished.

The exterior 

The Hill House was designed and constructed by Mackintosh and his wife Margaret MacDonald for a fee of £5,000. The exterior of the house is asymmetrical which shows Mackintosh’s appreciation for A. W. N. Pugin’s picturesque utility where the exterior contour evolves from the interior planning. 

The exterior qualities of the building are nearly the opposite of the warm, exotic, carefully decorated and smooth interior. Again, Mackintosh relates to Pugin’s theory by minimizing exterior decoration to emphasize the interior design: the transition from the outside world into a safe, fantastic inside space. Paint analysis of the harling on the exterior shows that it might have been left as an unpainted pale grey initially.

Mackintosh selected portland cement harling, then a newly introduced product, for the surface finish. This harling was found to be less durable than traditional lime harling and by 2017 it was discovered to be in a precarious condition, putting the integrity of the whole building at risk. As a temporary solution NTS has enclosed Hill House in a transparent porous "box", allowing some movement of air, so that the structure dries out gradually.

The interior 

The mansion combined the Edwardian period’s traditional ‘femininity’ of an intimate, inside space, with the ‘masculinity’ of the exterior public world, both uncommonly used throughout the interior of the building. To Mackintosh, bringing the masculine aspects to the inside would break away from the over decorated, entirely feminine conventional interiors. This allowed him to convey different feelings and experiences depending on the purpose of each space. Mackintosh used different materials, colours and lighting, when necessary to perform a full experiential transition from one point to another.

References

External links 

www.nts.org.uk/visit/places/the-hill-house from the National Trust for Scotland, including opening hours and location information.
www.greatbuildings.com with some exterior and interior photographs of the house.

See Also 

 Glasgow School of Art
 Willow Tearooms

Charles Rennie Mackintosh buildings
Arts and Crafts architecture in Scotland
National Trust for Scotland properties
Houses completed in 1904
Category A listed buildings in Argyll and Bute
Houses in Argyll and Bute
Historic house museums in Argyll and Bute
Landmark Trust properties in Scotland
Reportedly haunted locations in Scotland
Helensburgh
Art Nouveau architecture in Scotland
Art Nouveau houses